KXAZ (93.3 FM, "93.3 Jack FM") is a radio station licensed to serve Page, Arizona, United States. The station is owned by Lake Powell Communications. As of December 31, 2022, the station is silent, but previously aired an adult hits music format, specifically the Jack FM brand.

The station was assigned the KXAZ call sign by the Federal Communications Commission on November 2, 1981.

History
On April 2, 2012, KXAZ changed its format from adult contemporary to classic hits. On March 29, 2014, KXAZ changed its format from classic hits to Jack FM, which is their current format.

KXAZ began streaming online on February 6, 2017. Its online stream can be found at kxaz.streamon.fm.

The station was taken silent on December 31, 2022.

References

External links
 KXAZ official website
 

XAZ
Adult hits radio stations in the United States
Mass media in Coconino County, Arizona
Radio stations established in 1981